Rabin Koirala is a Nepalese politician, belonging to the CPN (UML). He is a former Member of Parliament, elected in 2013, and a former Mayor of Mechinagar.

References 

Year of birth missing (living people)
Living people
Members of the 2nd Nepalese Constituent Assembly
Communist Party of Nepal (Unified Marxist–Leninist) politicians
Mayors of places in Nepal